Nathan Burke was the final bassist, before the reunion, for Frodus. Burke currently plays in The Out Circuit and Night Is Invisible, both of which have released records on Lujo Records.

He currently lives in Seattle with his wife Rachel Burke who played in Beauty Pill which were on Dischord Records and has a child. His brother-in-law is Matt Johnson, who played in Ninety Pound Wuss, Raft of Dead Monkeys, and The Out Circuit. Burke briefly worked at Mars Hill Church with Johnson and Jeff Bettger.

In an interview with his brother-in-law, Johnson stated that He, Nathan, Ryan & Don had a project called Deathbed Atheist.

References

American rock bass guitarists
American male bass guitarists
Living people
Year of birth missing (living people)